Joseph Thomas Frederic Jacques Deslauriers (September 3, 1928 – February 17, 2018) was a Canadian professional ice hockey defenceman who played 2 games in the National Hockey League for the Montreal Canadiens.

References

External links

1928 births
2018 deaths
Canadian ice hockey defencemen
Cincinnati Mohawks (AHL) players
Dallas Texans (USHL) players
French Quebecers
Montreal Canadiens players
Rochester Americans players
Ice hockey people from Montreal
Canadian expatriate ice hockey players in the United States